In the 1843 Iowa Territory Council elections, electors selected councilors to serve in the sixth Iowa Territory Council. All 13 members of the Territory Council were elected. Councilors served one-year terms.

The Iowa Territory existed from July 4, 1838, until December 28, 1846, when Iowa was admitted to the Union as a state. At the time, the Iowa Territory had a Legislative Assembly consisting of an upper chamber (i.e., the Territory Council) and a lower chamber (i.e., the Territory House).

Following the previous election in 1842, Democrats held a majority with seven seats to Whigs' six seats.

To claim a majority of seats, the Whigs needed to net one seat from Democrats.

Democrats maintained a majority of seats in the Iowa Territory Council following the 1843 general election with the balance of power remaining unchanged with Democrats holding seven seats and Whigs having six seats. Democratic Councilor Thomas Cox was chosen as the President of the sixth Territory Council to succeed Whig Councilor John D. Elbert in that leadership position.

However, during the session, Democratic Councilor Thomas Cox died on November 9, 1844, causing a vacancy. Following Cox's death, Democrats and Whigs were tied with six seats each.

Summary of Results 

Source:

Detailed Results
NOTE: The Iowa General Assembly does not contain detailed vote totals for Territory Council elections in 1843.

See also
 Elections in Iowa

External links
District boundaries for the Iowa Territory Council in 1843:
Iowa Territory Council Districts 1840-1844 map

References

Iowa Council
Iowa
Iowa Senate elections